Eriococcus coriaceus is a scale insect of the genus Eriococcus. Its common names include Blue Gum Scale, gum-tree scale and common gum scale.

References

Eriococcidae